Teatergrillen is a Swedish restaurant at Nybrogatan in Stockholm. It was started by Tore Wretman.

References

External links
Official website

Restaurants in Stockholm